Scott Gavin Moloney (born 15 April 2000) is an English professional footballer who plays as a goalkeeper for  club Barrow.

Playing career

Early career
Moloney spent time with Hartlepool United before moving on to Bury. Having spent 21 games as an unused substitute following an injury to Joe Murphy, Moloney joined Skelmersdale United on loan on 7 September 2018. He played two Northern Premier League Division One West games for the "Blueboys", featuring in defeats to Radcliffe and Trafford.

Barrow
He was signed by EFL League Two club Barrow on 17 September 2020; manager David Dunn signed him to provide competition for Joel Dixon and Josh Lillis. He signed a new one-year contract in July 2021. He made his professional debut on 31 August 2021, in a 2–2 draw at Accrington Stanley in an EFL Trophy group stage game; Barrow lost the resulting penalty shoot-out 5–4. On 12 January 2022, Moloney joined Northern Premier League Premier Division side South Shields on a one-month loan deal, making three appearances. On 25 March 2022, he went out on loan for a further month to National League North side Guiseley. The deal was later extended until the end of the season. In July 2022, Moloney returned to Guiseley on loan until January 2023 following their relegation but was recalled by Barrow on 30 August 2022.

Statistics

References

2001 births
Living people
Footballers from Ashton-under-Lyne
English footballers
Association football goalkeepers
Hartlepool United F.C. players
Bury F.C. players
Skelmersdale United F.C. players
Barrow A.F.C. players
South Shields F.C. (1974) players
Guiseley A.F.C. players
Northern Premier League players
English Football League players